These are the squads for the national teams participated in the II World Cup of Masters held in Austria, in the summer of 1993. The tournament was played in two groups, culminating with the final between Austria and Italy.

Group A

Head coach: Enzo Bearzot

Head coach:

Head coach: Luciano do Valle

Head coach:

Group B

Head coach: Franz Hasil

Head coach:

Head coach:

Head coach:

References

World Cup of Masters events
1993